Şurakənd or Shurakend may refer to:
Şurakənd, Gadabay (disambiguation)
Günəşli (disambiguation), Azerbaijan
Şahdağ, Azerbaijan
Şurakənd, Goranboy, Azerbaijan
Şurakənd, Khizi, Azerbaijan